Tinfouchy (sometimes known as Fort Fouchet) is a locality and military base in the commune of Oum El Assel in Tindouf Province, Algeria. It is connected to the N50 national highway by a short local road to the north. It is the site of Tinfouchy Airport.

References

Neighbouring towns and cities

Populated places in Tindouf Province